The 2014–15 Iranian Futsal 1st Division will be divided into two phases.

The league will also be composed of 16 teams divided into two divisions of 8 teams each, whose teams will be divided geographically. Teams will play only other teams in their own division, once at home and once away for a total of 14 matches each.

Teams

Group Khazar Sea

Group Persian Gulf 

1 Moghavemat Kerman Renamed to Bank Resalat Kerman
2 Amaliyat Qeyr Sanati Renamed to Esteghlal Novin

League standings

Group A

Group B

Results table

Group A

Group B

Clubs season-progress

Play-off

Clubs season-progress

See also 
 2014–15 Futsal Super League
 2015 Futsal's 2nd Division
 2014–15 Iran Pro League
 2014–15 Azadegan League
 2014–15 Iran Football's 2nd Division
 2014–15 Iran Football's 3rd Division
 2014–15 Hazfi Cup
 Iranian Super Cup

References

External links 
   فوتسال نیوز 
  I.R. Iran Football Federation

Iran Futsal's 1st Division seasons
2014–15 in Iranian futsal leagues